The piastre de commerce was the currency of French Indochina between 1885 and 1952. It was subdivided into 100 cents, each of 2~6 sapèques.

The name piastre, from Spanish pieces of eight (pesos), dates to the 16th century and has been used as the name of many different historical units of currency.

Denominations 

The currency of French Indochina was divided into the piastre, cent / centime, and sapèque units. One piastre equals 100 cents and one cent equals between 2 and 6 sapèques depending on the dynasty and reign era. According to that ratio, a French Indochinese piastre coin is worth from 200 to 600 traditional Vietnamese cash coins. The Obverse of the banknotes and coins were inscribed in the French language, while the reverse side had inscriptions written in Traditional Chinese, Vietnamese Latin script, Lao, and Khmer scripts, but sometimes only French inscriptions were written.

History 
Prior to the arrival of the French in Indo-China in the second half of the 19th century, cash coins similar to those used in the provinces of China circulated in the area that is nowadays known as Vietnam. There was also a silver milled dragon coin and associated subsidiary coinage in circulation. The Tự Đức Thông Bảo dragon coin is believed to have been in imitation of the Spanish silver dollar or Philippine peso or Mexican peso which also circulated widely in the region at that time emanating from the Philippines as part of the Spanish East Indies of the Spanish colonial empire, however the dragon dollars were worth less because the fineness of the silver was less than that in the Spanish and Mexican dollars. In the region that is nowadays Cambodia and Laos, the Siamese coinage circulated and Cambodia had its own regional varieties of the Siamese Tical (Thai Baht).

The French began their Indo-Chinese empire in 1862 with Cochinchina which is the area around the Mekong Delta and Saigon, and which is nowadays the extreme southern part of Vietnam. This empire very quickly expanded to include Cambodia which had been a vassal state of the Kingdom of Siam. In 1875, the French introduced a Cambodian franc to Cambodia. Although these francs were minted in Belgium between 1875 and 1885, they always bore the date 1860. The French also began to introduce a subsidiary coinage in 'cents' into Cochinchina in the late 1870s. These cents were actually subsidiary coinage of the Spanish dollar unit, also known as Philippine peso or Mexican peso in the Spanish colonial empire, as opposed to being subsidiary coinage of the French franc.

In 1884, the French empire in Indo-China further expanded to incorporate Annam and Tonkin. The following year, in 1885, the French introduced a new silver piastre de commerce and associated subsidiary coinage throughout the entire Indo-Chinese colonies in order to increase monetary stability. The piastre was initially equivalent to the Spanish silver dollar or Philippine peso or Mexican peso. The piastre was therefore a direct lineal descendant of the Spanish pieces of eight that emanated from the Philippines in the Spanish East Indies after being brought to the Orient from Mexico and Peru on the Manila Galleons in the Manila-Acapulco Galleon trade of the Spanish colonial empire. It was initially on a silver standard of 1 piastre = 24.4935 grams pure silver. This was reduced to 24.3 grams in 1895.

During the first 11 years of their colonial rule, the French had minted millions of silver coins. However, because these French silver piastres were heavier than the Spanish or Philippine or Mexican reals, that already circulated in French Indochina at the time, the French made piastres were often hoarded by the local populace, especially by the highland tribes (Gresham's law). On July 8, 1895, and later again on April 14, 1898, it was decreed that new silver French Indochinese piastre coins would be minted with a lower weight, which allowed them to stay in general circulation. In 1895 the weight of the silver 1 piastre coin was reduced to 27 grams; the 50 cents to 13.5 grams; the 20 cents to 5.4 grams; and the 10 cents to 2.7 grams.

In the year 1897 the weight of the copper-alloy 1 cent was also reduced to 7.0 and 7.5 grams in 1897 and was holed. These weights and denominations of the French Indochinese piastre would continue for some time until during and after World War I when the global value of silver had become very high.

The governor of French Indochina issued a decree on 1 January 1906 that the Spanish colonial real or Philippine or Mexican real were no longer legal tender in the colony. Despite this decree, a number Spanish or Philippine or Mexican silver coins that had been cut into halves, fourths and eighths would remain in circulation. Chopmarked piastres were also officially banned from circulation, while the native Vietnamese cash coins were still considered legal tender.

French Indo-China was one of the last places to abandon the silver standard. The piastre remained on the silver standard until 1920, when due to the rise in the price of silver after the First World War, it was pegged to the French franc at a varying rate hence putting it unto a gold exchange standard.

After World War I broke out, many local and French people in French Indochina became worried that the central powers would attack the colony and mass converted their Bank of Indochina banknotes into silver coins. Following this, silver disappeared from circulation from a time.

The silver standard was restored in 1921 and maintained until 1930, when the piastre was pegged to the franc at a rate of 1 piastre = 10 francs. During the World War II Japanese occupation, an exchange rate of 0.976 piastre = 1 Japanese yen operated, with the pre-war peg to the franc restored after the war. However, in December 1945, to avoid the French franc's devaluation, the peg was changed to 1 piastre = 17 francs. This increased rate created huge financial opportunity by exchanging piastres into francs since the real value of piastres remained around 10 francs in Indochina, attracting organized crime and resulting in the Piastres Affair in 1950.

In 1946, the North Vietnamese đồng was introduced, which replaced the piastre at par. In 1952/1953, the Lao kip (1952), Cambodian riel (1953), and South Vietnamese đồng (1953) were introduced at par with the piastre. Initially, the paper money bore denominations both in the local currency and the piastre, but coins were denominated in the national units since the beginning. These initially circulated alongside the old piastre currency. The peg of 1 piastre = 10 francs was restored in 1953. The dual denominated notes circulated until 1955 in South Vietnam and Cambodia, and 1957 in Laos.

Coins

Coins issued before World War II 

The coin was first introduced in 1880 then 1883 then in 1885 as so on. In 1885, bronze 1 cent and silver 10, 20 and 50 cents and 1 piastre coins were introduced. These were followed in 1887 by holed, bronze 2 sapèque. In 1895, the weights of the silver coins were reduced, due to the reduction in the silver peg of the currency. From 1896, the 1 cent was also a holed coin. In 1923, holed, cupro-nickel 5 cents were introduced, followed by holed, bronze  cent in 1935.

During World War II 

In 1939, zinc  cent and both nickel and cupro-nickel 10 and 20 cent coins were introduced. All three were holed, with the  cent in zinc and the other two in aluminium. In 1945, aluminium 10 and 20 cents were introduced, followed by unholed aluminium 5 cents and cupro-nickel 1 piastre coins.

Last issues 

The last piastre coins were issued in the name of the "Indochinese Federation". The first Lao kip coins were dated 1952, while the first South Vietnamese đồng and Cambodian riel were dated 1953.

Banknotes 

In 1892, the Banque de l'Indochine introduced 1 piastre notes, followed the next year by 5, 20 and 100 piastres. Between 1920 and 1922, 10, 20 and 50 cent notes were also issued. In 1939, 500 piastre notes were introduced. In 1939, the Gouvernement General de l'Indochine introduced 10, 20 and 50 cent notes, followed by 5 cents in 1942. In 1945, the Banque de l'Indochine introduced 50 piastres, followed by 10 piastres in 1947.

In 1953, the Institut d'Emission des Etats du Cambodge, du Laos et du Vietnam took over the issuance of paper money. A 1 piastre note was issued that year in the name of all three states. In addition, between 1952 and 1954, notes were introduced denominated in piastre and one of three new currencies, the Cambodian riel, Lao kip and South Vietnamese đồng. For Cambodia, notes in denominations of 1, 5, 10, 100 and 200 piastres/riel were introduced. For Laos, 1, 5, 10 and 100 piastres/kip were introduced. For South Vietnam, 1, 5, 10, 100 and 200 piastres/đồng were introduced.

See also 

 Cochinchina Piastre
 Piastres Affair
 French Indochina
 First Indochina War
 Khải Định Thông Bảo
 Bảo Đại Thông Bảo

References 

 Howard A. Daniel, III (1978) The Catalog and Guidebook of Southeast Asian Coins and Currency. Volume I: France. 
 Jean Lecompte (2000) Monnaies et Jetons des Colonies Françaises.

External links 
Coins and Banknotes of Vietnam and French Indochina

Currencies of Asia
Modern obsolete currencies
Economic history of Cambodia
Economic history of Vietnam
Currencies of Cambodia
Currencies of Laos
Currencies of Vietnam
Piastre